Loum Tchaouna (born 8 September 2003) is a professional footballer who plays as a forward for  club Dijon on loan from Rennes. Born in Chad, he represents France at international level.

Club career 
Tchaouna was born in N'Djamena, Chad. He played for youth teams of FC Kronenbourg, Schiltigheim, Strasbourg, and Rennes. He made his professional debut for Rennes on 26 September 2021 in a 1–1 Ligue 1 draw with Bordeaux.

On 30 August 2022, Tchaouna joined Dijon on loan.

International career
Born in Chad, Tchaouna moved to France at a young age. He is a youth international for France.

Personal life 
Loum's brother Haroun is also a professional footballer. He plays for the Chad national team.

References

External links
 Stade Rennais F.C. profile
 Loum Tchaouna at the French Football Federation

2003 births
Living people
People from N'Djamena
French footballers
Chadian footballers
Association football forwards
France youth international footballers
Chadian emigrants to France
French sportspeople of Chadian descent
Black French sportspeople
Stade Rennais F.C. players
Dijon FCO players
Championnat National 3 players
Ligue 1 players
Ligue 2 players